The Po Leung Kuk, founded as the Society for the Protection of Women and Children, is a charitable organisation in Hong Kong that provides support for orphaned children, education and other services.

History 

In the late 19th century, abduction and trafficking of women and children were widespread in Hong Kong, under the mui tsai system. On 8 November 1878, a group of local Chinese (Lo Lai-ping, Shi Shang-kai, Fung Ming-shan and Tse Tat-shing) presented a petition to the Governor of Hong Kong, John Pope Hennessy to set up Po Leung Kuk to rescue the kidnapped victims and the society was officially opened in August 1882.

The stated objective of the Kuk, as it is informally known, is to care for the young and protect the innocent. In the early days, it was primarily engaged in suppressing abduction of women and children and providing shelters and education for such victims. There were some difficulties with the colonial government, as a result of cultural differences, but the overall intention of improving the lot of unfortunates was earnestly pursued. However, it has been suggested that the arrangements the Kuk provided had the convenient effect of maintaining a supply of servants and potential concubines for the wealthy Chinese families of Hong Kong, in a "peculiarly Chinese form of patriarchy".

Today Po Leung Kuk has over 300 units providing a wide spectrum of services, including social services (including medical services), educational services, recycling centers, recreational services and cultural services.

Services

The Kuk currently runs more than 300 units throughout the SAR, providing welfare, educational, cultural and recreational services.

It is now known mostly for running schools in Hong Kong, with PLK Vicwood KT Chong Sixth Form College being their most widely known school.

See also
Primary Mathematics World Contest
Po Leung Kuk Museum
Penang Po Leung Kuk
Singapore Po Leung Kuk

References

 
Children's charities based in Hong Kong
Educational organisations based in Hong Kong
Organizations established in 1878